Derek Strickland (born 7 November 1959) is a Scottish former professional football player.

Strickland joined Rangers in 1978 and made his debut for the club on 23 August that year in a League Cup match away to Albion Rovers. His second, and final, appearance for the club came at the end of that season in a 2-1 league defeat to Hibernian. In 1979 Strickland joined Leicester City and made seven league appearances, scoring twice. He moved on to have an unsuccessful stint with Hearts then played with East Stirlingshire before leaving the senior football ranks. He later joined Stoneyburn before playing for and managing Whitburn for a number of years.

Strickland took over as manager of Bathgate Thistle in April 2012 but resigned in June 2013.

References

External links

1959 births
Living people
Rangers F.C. players
Leicester City F.C. players
Heart of Midlothian F.C. players
East Stirlingshire F.C. players
Stoneyburn F.C. players
Whitburn Junior F.C. players
Association football forwards
Scottish footballers
Scottish Football League players
English Football League players
Scottish Junior Football Association players
Scottish Junior Football Association managers
Scottish football managers
Armadale Thistle F.C. non-playing staff
Bathgate Thistle F.C. non-playing staff
Whitburn F.C. non-playing staff